This is a list of the members of the British nobility and gentry, who in 1688 deserted King James II and pledged their allegiances to Prince William of Orange, as the events of the Glorious Revolution unfolded.
Admiral Matthew Aylmer, who played a significant role in diverting the loyalty of the Royal Navy from King James to William of Orange.
Colonel Berkley, possibly Lord Fitzharding.
Captain Henry Bertie (died 1743), brother of the Earl of Abingdon.
Squire Bray
Henry Booth, 2nd Baron Delamere, took arms in Cheshire in November 1688, appearing in Manchester with 50 armed and mounted men, which had trebled before reaching Bowden Downs.
James Butler, 2nd Duke of Ormonde
William Cavendish, 4th Earl of Devonshire, appeared in arms at Derby, proceeded to Nottingham, which soon became the headquarters of the Northern insurrection.
John Cecil, 5th Earl of Exeter
Hugh Cholmondeley, 2nd Viscount Cholmondeley, joined the northern insurrection at Nottingham in 1688, created Baron in 1689 and Earl in 1706.
Charles Cokayne, 3rd Viscount Cullen (died 30 December 1688)
Squire Coote
George Compton, 4th Earl of Northampton
Henry Compton, youngest son of the 2nd Earl of Northampton, Bishop of London, P.C.
George Churchill (1653–1710), brother of John Churchill and captain at sea, afterwards admiral.
John Churchill, Baron Churchill of Sandridge (1650–1722), deserted on 25 Nov 1688, arguably "the death-blow for the Royal Cause". Afterwards created Earl and later Duke of Marlborough and captain-general.
Sir Richard Dutton, or possibly Sir Ralph Dutton, MP for Gloucester
Thomas Fairfax, 5th Lord Fairfax of Cameron, MP for York.
Charles Fane, 3rd Earl of Westmorland
Henry FitzRoy, 1st Duke of Grafton, the first who on 24 November 1688 deserted the King's camp, accompanied by John Churchill.
Charles Gerard, 1st Earl of Macclesfield, an "ancient Cavalier who had fought for Charles I, and had shared the exile of Charles II", assembled with William at the Hague in 1688.
John Granville, 1st Earl of Bath, placed the fortress at Plymouth, which he commanded, at William's disposal on 18 November 1688, when William had arrived at Exeter. "The invaders therefore had now not a single enemy in their rear."
Thomas Grey, 2nd Earl of Stamford
Captain Griffith
Sir John Guise, Baronet (died 1695), MP for Gloucester
Henry Hamilton-Moore, 3rd Earl of Drogheda
Sir Edward Harley, Baronet, in November 1688 took up arms in Worcestershire on behalf of the Prince of Orange.
Arthur Herbert, vice admiral, created Earl of Torrington in 1689.
Henry Herbert, 4th Baron Herbert of Cherbury, in November 1688 took up arms in Worcestershire on behalf of the Prince of Orange.
Henry Howard, 7th Duke of Norfolk, with 300 armed and mounted men, in November 1688 appeared in the market place of Norwich, where he was joined by the mayor and Alderman.
Edward Hyde, Lord Cornbury (1661–1723), son of the Earl of Clarendon and one of the first royal commanders to desert. He was the senior officer at Salisbury and deserted with as many troops as he could induce to follow him.
Henry Hyde, 2nd Earl of Clarendon (1638–1709), father of Lord Cornbury
Robert Leke, 3rd Earl of Scarsdale
John Lovelace, 3rd Baron Lovelace, set out for Exeter to join the Prince of Orange, but was taken prisoner at Gloucester.
Richard Lumley seized Newcastle for William, created Viscount Lumley in 1689 and Earl of Scarborough in 1690.
John Manners, 9th Earl of Rutland
Squire Marle
Charles Montagu, 4th Earl of Manchester, moved to Nottingham and was joined by Lord Cholmondeley and by Lord Grey de Ruthyn.
Edward Osborne, Viscount Latimer (died 1689), son the Earl of Danby.
Peregrine Osborne, Lord Dunblane, son the Earl of Danby.
Thomas Osborne, 1st Earl of Danby (1631–1712), seized York for William, was created Duke of Leeds in 1694.
James Paynter, tried for and later acquitted of treason in Cornwall.
Sir Robert Peyton, Baronet (died 1689), colonel in the Dutch invasion
Charles Powlett, Earl of Wiltshire
Charles Bodvile Robartes, 2nd Earl of Radnor
Richard Savage, Lord Colchester, son of Earl Rivers
Charles Seymour, 6th Duke of Somerset
Robert Shirley, Lord Ferrers of Chartley
Philip Stanhope, 2nd Earl of Chesterfield
Charles Talbot, 12th Earl of Shrewsbury
Squire Tibbing, probably Squire Thomas Tipping (1653–1718), former MP for Oxfordshire who had fled to the Netherlands due to a scandal
Sir John Trelawney, possibly Sir Jonathan Trelawny, 3rd Baronet
Squire Trenchard (1635–1713), possibly William Trenchard of Cutteridge, Wiltshire
Henry Yelverton, 15th Baron Grey de Ruthyn, joined the Northern insurrection in 1688, created Viscount de Longueville in 1690.

References

Sources

Citations

1688 in England
Stuart England
1688 in Scotland
People of the Glorious Revolution
British monarchy-related lists
James II of England